The Chiayi Cultural and Creative Industries Park is a multi-purpose park in North District, Tainan, Taiwan.

History
The main red brick building of the park was built in the 1900s as the Monopoly Bureau branch of Taiwan Governor's Office during the Japanese rule. The park was opened on 17 July 2011.

Architecture
The park consists of a red brick building, former warehouse and dormitory of Taiwan Railways Administration.

Transportation
The park is accessible within walking distance from Tainan Station of Taiwan Railways.

See also
 List of tourist attractions in Taiwan

References

External links

 
 YouTube - B16臺南文化創意產業園區

2011 establishments in Taiwan
Buildings and structures in Tainan